Imperial immediacy ( or ) was a privileged constitutional and political status rooted in German feudal law under which the Imperial estates of the Holy Roman Empire such as Imperial cities, prince-bishoprics and secular principalities, and individuals such as the Imperial knights, were declared free from the authority of any local lord and placed under the direct ("immediate", in the sense of "without an intermediary") authority of the Holy Roman Emperor, and later of the institutions of the Empire such as the Diet, the Imperial Chamber of Justice and the Aulic Council.

The granting of immediacy began in the Early Middle Ages, and for the immediate bishops, abbots, and cities, then the main beneficiaries of that status, immediacy could be exacting and often meant being subjected to the fiscal, military, and hospitality demands of their overlord, the Emperor. However, with the gradual exit of the Emperor from the centre stage from the mid-13th century onwards, holders of imperial immediacy eventually found themselves vested with considerable rights and powers previously exercised by the emperor.

In today's terms, it would be understood as a limited form of sovereignty.

Gradations 

 the seven Prince-electors designated by the Golden Bull of 1356
 the other Princes of the Holy Roman Empire
 secular: Dukes, Margraves, Landgraves, et al.
 ecclesiastical: Prince-Bishops, Prince-Abbots and Prince-Provosts.

They formed the Imperial Estates, together with 99 immediate counts, 40 Imperial prelates (abbots and abbesses), and 50 Imperial Cities, each of whose "banks" only enjoyed a single collective vote.

At the same time, there were classes of "princes" with titular immediacy to the Emperor which they exercised rarely, if at all. For example, the Bishops of Chiemsee, Gurk, and Seckau (Sacken) were practically subordinate to the prince-bishop of Salzburg, but were formally princes of the Empire.

Advantages and disadvantages 

Additional advantages might include the rights to collect taxes and tolls, to hold a market, to mint coins, to bear arms, and to conduct legal proceedings. The last of these might include the so-called  ("blood justice") through which capital punishment could be administered. These rights varied according to the legal patents granted by the emperor.

As pointed out by Jonathan Israel, the Dutch province of Overijssel in 1528 tried to arrange its submission to Emperor Charles V in his capacity as Holy Roman Emperor rather than as his being the Duke of Burgundy. If successful, that would have evoked Imperial immediacy and would have put Overijssel in a stronger negotiating position, for example given the province the ability to appeal to the Imperial Diet in any debate with Charles. For that reason, the Emperor strongly rejected and blocked Overijssel's attempt. 

Disadvantages might include direct intervention by imperial commissions, as happened in several of the southwestern cities after the Schmalkaldic War, and the potential restriction or outright loss of previously held legal patents. Immediate rights might be lost if the Emperor and/or the Imperial Diet could not defend them against external aggression, as occurred in the French Revolutionary wars and the Napoleonic Wars. The Treaty of Lunéville in 1801 required the emperor to renounce all claims to the portions of the Holy Roman Empire west of the Rhine. At the last meeting of the Imperial Diet in 1802–03, also called the German Mediatisation, most of the free imperial cities and the ecclesiastic states lost their imperial immediacy and were absorbed by several dynastic states.

Problems in understanding the Empire 

The practical application of the rights of immediacy was complex; this makes the history of the Holy Roman Empire particularly difficult to understand, especially for modern historians. Even such contemporaries as Goethe and Fichte called the Empire a monstrosity.  Voltaire wrote of the Empire as something neither Holy nor Roman, nor an Empire, and in comparison to the British Empire, saw its German counterpart as an abysmal failure that reached its pinnacle of success in the early Middle Ages and declined thereafter. Prussian historian Heinrich von Treitschke described it in the 19th century as having become "a chaotic mess of rotted imperial forms and unfinished territories". For nearly a century after the publication of James Bryce's monumental work The Holy Roman Empire (1864), this view prevailed among most English-speaking historians of the Early Modern period, and contributed to the development of the  theory of the German past.

A  argued that "though not powerful politically or militarily, [the Empire] was extraordinarily diverse and free by the standards of Europe at the time". Pointing out that people like Goethe meant "monster" as a compliment (i.e. 'an astonishing thing'), The Economist has called the Empire "a great place to live ... a union with which its subjects identified, whose loss distressed them greatly" and praised its cultural and religious diversity, saying that it "allowed a degree of liberty and diversity that was unimaginable in the neighbouring kingdoms" and that "ordinary folk, including women, had far more rights to property than in France or Spain".

Furthermore, the prestige of the Emperor among the German people outweighed his lack of legal and military authority. One need find no better proof of this than the fact that the constitution of Germany remained little changed for centuries, with hundreds of tiny enclaves co-existing peacefully with much larger and often greedy and militaristic neighbors. Only external factors in form of the French military aggression during the Thirty Years' War and the Revolutionary period served to alter Germany's constitution. Napoleon's overthrow of the Empire in favor of his puppet Confederation of the Rhine was a deep moral blow to many Germans. The cringing attitude of the princes and their avaricious behavior during the mediatizations embarrassed the people and, however much they despised the Empire's weakness, it was still a great and old symbol of Germany. Such symbolism was revived in 1848, when the so-called Provisional Central Power of Germany chose 6 August 1848, the 42nd anniversary of the end of the Empire, as the day the soldiers of Germany should swear oaths of loyalty to the new situation (see Military Parade of August 6th), as well as the German Empire of 1871.

See also 
 Free Imperial City
 German mediatization
 Imperial Abbey
 Imperial Diet (Holy Roman Empire)
 Imperial Estate
 Imperial Village
 List of states of the Holy Roman Empire
 Tenant-in-chief
 Autonomous administrative division

References

Citations

Sources 
 
 Bryce, James (1865). Holy Roman Empire. London.
 Sheehan, James (1989). German History 1770–1866. Oxford: Oxford University Press.

Legal history of the Holy Roman Empire